The UK Lingerie Awards are held annually in the United Kingdom to present awards to key individuals from the British lingerie industry, including designers and retailers. The awards are organized by the lingerie industry magazine Lingerie Insight.

2011 Awards
The inaugural event was held in September 2011 at One Mayfair, London formerly a church and now a Grade 1 listed building.

The awards were decided by a panel of 7 judges from the lingerie industry before the night. They were: Nichole de Carle (Lingerie designer), Claire Franks (Intimate Apparel Consultancy), Kelly Isaac (The Lingerie Collective), June Kenton (Rigby & Peller), Gillian Proctor (De Montfort University), Kat Slowe (Lingerie Insight) and Sharon Webb (Debenhams).

20 awards were handed out during the ceremony with several receiving more than one nomination. Lingerie Brands Curvy Kate and Lascivious received 3 nominations with La Perla, Obey My Demand and Triumph receiving 2 nominations. Retailers Debenhams and La Senza also received 2 nominations but no brand or retailer won more than one award on the night. The winners and finalists for each category were as follows:

2012 Awards
The 2012 ceremony took place in September 2012 at One Mayfair again. The judging panel for 2012 consists of 9 industry figures, 4 return from the 2011 panel: Claire Franks (Intimate Apparel Consultancy), Kelly Issac (Lingerie Collective), Gillian Proctor (De Montfort University) and Sharon Webb (Debenhams). The 5 new judges are Paul Ager (UK Fashion & Textile Association), Helen Attwood (Selfridges), Michele Duncan (Invista), Joanna Holmes (Shop Direct Group) and Barbara Horspool (New Look).

20 awards were handed out during the night. 3 awards were dropped, the Bridal, Ethical and Men's Brands categories and 3 new awards were added, "Favourite British Lingerie Designer", "Favourite Retailer" and "Favourite Lingerie Brand". These 3 were voted for by the public not by the judging panel. Lingerie brands Curvy Kate and Dirty Pretty Things received 4 nominations whilst 7 other brands had 2 (Freya, Kiss Me Deadly, La Perla, Made by Niki, Myla, Panache and Paolita). 3 retailers also received 2 nominations, Betty & Belle, Debenhams and Figleaves. The winners and finalists for each category are as follows:

2013 Awards
The winners for the 2013 awards are as follows:

2014 Awards
The winners for the 2014 awards are as follows:

2015 Awards

See also
 List of fashion awards

References

External links

Fashion awards
2011 establishments in the United Kingdom
Recurring events established in 2011
British awards
British fashion
Lingerie
Annual events in the United Kingdom